Capperia is a genus of moths in the family Pterophoridae.

Species

Capperia agadirensis 
Capperia bonneaui 
Capperia britanniodactylus 
Capperia celeusi 
Capperia evansi 
Capperia fletcheri 
Capperia fusca 
Capperia hellenica 
Capperia irkutica 
Capperia jozana 
Capperia loranus 
Capperia maratonica 
Capperia marginellus 
Capperia meyi 
Capperia ningoris 
Capperia polonica 
Capperia raptor 
Capperia salanga 
Capperia taurica 
Capperia trichodactyla 
Capperia washbourni 
Capperia zelleri 

Oxyptilini
Moth genera
Taxa named by J. W. Tutt